

Events

Pre-1600
 326 – The old St. Peter's Basilica is consecrated by Pope Sylvester I.
 401 – The Visigoths, led by king Alaric I, cross the Alps and invade northern Italy.
1095 – The Council of Clermont begins: called by Pope Urban II, it led to the First Crusade to the Holy Land.
1105 – Maginulfo is elected Antipope Sylvester IV in opposition to Pope Paschal II.
1210 – Pope Innocent III excommunicates Holy Roman Emperor Otto IV for invading the Kingdom of Sicily after promising to recognize papal control over it.
1302 – Pope Boniface VIII issues the Papal bull Unam sanctam, claiming spiritual supremacy for the papacy.
1421 – St Elizabeth's flood: A dike in the Grote Hollandse Waard in the Netherlands breaks, killing about 10,000 people.
1493 – Christopher Columbus first sights the island now known as Puerto Rico.

1601–1900
1601 – Tiryaki Hasan Pasha, an Ottoman provincial governor, routs the Habsburg forces commanded by Archduke Ferdinand II of Austria who were besieging Nagykanizsa.
1626 – The new St. Peter's Basilica in Rome is consecrated.
1730 – The future Frederick the Great of Prussia is granted a pardon by his father and is released from confinement.
1760 – The rebuilt debtors' prison, at the Castellania in Valletta, receives the first prisoners.
1803 – The Battle of Vertières, the last major battle of the Haitian Revolution, is fought, leading to the establishment of the Republic of Haiti, the first black republic in the Western Hemisphere.
1809 – In a naval action during the Napoleonic Wars, French frigates defeat British East Indiamen in the Bay of Bengal.
1812 – Napoleonic Wars: The Battle of Krasnoi ends in French defeat, but Marshal of France Michel Ney's leadership leads to him becoming known as "the bravest of the brave".
1863 – King Christian IX of Denmark signs the November constitution that declares Schleswig to be part of Denmark. This is seen by the German Confederation as a violation of the London Protocol and leads to the German–Danish war of 1864.
1867 – An earthquake strikes the Virgin Islands, triggering the largest tsunami witnessed in the Caribbean and killing dozens.
1872 – Susan B. Anthony and 14 other women are arrested for voting illegally in the United States presidential election of 1872.
1883 – American and Canadian railroads institute five standard continental time zones, ending the confusion of thousands of local times.

1901–present
1901 – Britain and the United States sign the Hay–Pauncefote Treaty, which nullifies the Clayton–Bulwer Treaty and withdraws British objections to an American-controlled canal in Panama.
1903 – The Hay–Bunau-Varilla Treaty is signed by the United States and Panama, giving the United States exclusive rights over the Panama Canal Zone.
1905 – Prince Carl of Denmark becomes King Haakon VII of Norway.
1909 – Two United States warships are sent to Nicaragua after 500 revolutionaries (including two Americans) are executed by order of José Santos Zelaya.
1910 – In their campaign for women's voting rights, hundreds of suffragettes march to the British Parliament in London. Several are beaten by police, newspaper attention embarrasses the authorities, and the march is dubbed Black Friday.
1916 – World War I: First Battle of the Somme: In France, British Expeditionary Force commander Douglas Haig calls off the battle which started on July 1, 1916.
1918 – Latvia declares its independence from Russia.
1928 – Release of the animated short Steamboat Willie, the first fully synchronized sound cartoon, directed by Walt Disney and Ub Iwerks, featuring the third appearances of cartoon characters Mickey Mouse and Minnie Mouse. This is considered by the Disney corporation to be Mickey's birthday.
1929 – Grand Banks earthquake: Off the south coast of Newfoundland in the Atlantic Ocean, a Richter magnitude 7.2 submarine earthquake, centered on the  Grand Banks, breaks 12 submarine transatlantic telegraph cables and triggers a tsunami that destroys many south coast communities in the Burin Peninsula.
1940 – World War II: German leader Adolf Hitler and Italian Foreign Minister Galeazzo Ciano meet to discuss Benito Mussolini's disastrous Italian invasion of Greece.
1943 – World War II: Battle of Berlin: Four hundred and forty Royal Air Force planes bomb Berlin causing only light damage and killing 131. The RAF loses nine aircraft and 53 air crew.
1944 – The Popular Socialist Youth is founded in Cuba.
1947 – The Ballantyne's Department Store fire in Christchurch, New Zealand, kills 41; it is the worst fire disaster in the history of New Zealand.
1949 – The Iva Valley Shooting occurs after the coal miners of Enugu in Nigeria go on strike over withheld wages; 21 miners are shot dead and 51 are wounded by police under the supervision of the British colonial administration of Nigeria.
1961 – United States President John F. Kennedy sends 18,000 military advisors to South Vietnam.
1963 – The first push-button telephone goes into service.
1970 – U.S. President Richard Nixon asks the U.S. Congress for $155 million in supplemental aid for the Cambodian government.
1971 – Oman declares its independence from the United Kingdom.
1978 – The McDonnell Douglas F/A-18 Hornet makes its first flight, at the Naval Air Test Center in Maryland, United States.
  1978   – In Jonestown, Guyana, Jim Jones leads his Peoples Temple to a mass murder–suicide that claimed 918 lives in all, 909 of them in Jonestown itself, including over 270 children. 
1987 – King's Cross fire: In London, 31 people die in a fire at the city's busiest underground station, King's Cross St Pancras.
1991 – Shiite Muslim kidnappers in Lebanon release Anglican Church envoys Terry Waite and Thomas Sutherland.
  1991   – After an 87-day siege, the Croatian city of Vukovar capitulates to the besieging Yugoslav People's Army and allied Serb paramilitary forces.
  1991   – The autonomous Croatian Community of Herzeg-Bosnia, which would in 1993 become a republic, was established in Bosnia and Herzegovina.
1993 – In the United States, the North American Free Trade Agreement (NAFTA) is approved by the House of Representatives.
  1993   – In South Africa, 21 political parties approve a new constitution, expanding voting rights and ending white minority rule.
1996 – A fire occurs on a train traveling through the Channel Tunnel from France to England causing several injuries and damaging approximately 500 metres (1,600 ft) of tunnel.  
1999 – At Texas A&M University, the Aggie Bonfire collapses killing 12 students and injuring 27 others.
2002 – Iraq disarmament crisis: United Nations weapons inspectors led by Hans Blix arrive in Iraq.
2003 – The Massachusetts Supreme Judicial Court rules 4–3 in Goodridge v. Department of Public Health that the state's ban on same-sex marriage is unconstitutional and gives the state legislature 180days to change the law making Massachusetts the first state in the United States to grant marriage rights to same-sex couples.
2012 – Pope Tawadros II of Alexandria becomes the 118th Pope of the Coptic Orthodox Church of Alexandria.
2013 – NASA launches the MAVEN probe to Mars.
2020 – The Utah monolith, built sometime in 2016 is discovered by state biologists of the Utah Division of Wildlife Resources.

Births

Pre-1600
 701 – Itzam K'an Ahk II, Mayan ruler (d. 757)
 709 – Emperor Kōnin of Japan (d. 782)
1522 – Lamoral, Count of Egmont (d. 1568)
1571 – Hippolytus Guarinonius, Italian physician and polymath (d. 1654)
1576 – Philipp Ludwig II, Count of Hanau-Münzenberg (d. 1612)

1601–1900
1630 – Eleonora Gonzaga, Italian wife of Ferdinand III, Holy Roman Emperor (d. 1686)
1647 – Pierre Bayle, French philosopher and author (d. 1706)
1727 – Philibert Commerson, French physician and explorer (d. 1773)
1736 – Carl Friedrich Christian Fasch, German harpsichord player and composer (d. 1800)
1756 – Thomas Burgess, English bishop and philosopher (d. 1837)
1772 – Prince Louis Ferdinand of Prussia (d. 1806)
1774 – Wilhelmine of Prussia, Queen of the Netherlands (d. 1837)
1785 – David Wilkie, Scottish painter and academic (d. 1841)
1787 – Louis Daguerre, French artist, photographer and inventor (d. 1851)
1804 – Alfonso Ferrero La Marmora, Italian general and politician, 6th Prime Minister of Italy (d. 1878)
1810 – Asa Gray, American botanist and academic (d. 1888)
1832 – Adolf Erik Nordenskiöld, Finnish-Swedish geologist and explorer (d. 1901)
1833 – James Patterson, English-Australian politician, 17th Premier of Victoria (d. 1895)
1836 – W. S. Gilbert, English playwright, poet, and illustrator (d. 1911)
1839 – August Kundt, German physicist and educator (d. 1894)
1856 – Grand Duke Nicholas Nikolaevich of Russia (d. 1929)
1860 – Ignacy Jan Paderewski, Polish pianist, composer, and politician, 2nd Prime Minister of the Republic of Poland (d. 1941)
1866 – Henry Daglish, Australian politician, 6th Premier of Western Australia (d. 1920)
1874 – Clarence Day, American author and poet (d. 1935)
1876 – Victor Hémery, French racing driver (d. 1950)
1880 – Naum Torbov, Bulgarian architect, designed the Central Sofia Market Hall (d. 1952)
1882 – Amelita Galli-Curci, Italian-American soprano (d. 1963)
  1882   – Wyndham Lewis, English painter and critic (d. 1957)
  1882   – Jacques Maritain, French philosopher and author (d. 1973)
  1882   – Frances Gertrude McGill, pioneering Canadian forensic pathologist (d. 1959)
1883 – Carl Vinson, American judge and politician (d. 1981)
1886 – Ferenc Münnich, Hungarian soldier and politician, 47th Prime Minister of Hungary (d. 1967)
1888 – Frances Marion, American screenwriter, novelist and journalist (d. 1973)
1889 – Stanislav Kosior, Polish-Russian politician (d. 1939)
1891 – Gio Ponti, Italian architect, industrial designer, furniture designer, artist, and publisher.(d. 1979)
1897 – Patrick Blackett, Baron Blackett, English physicist and academic, Nobel Prize laureate (d. 1974)
1899 – Eugene Ormandy, Hungarian-American violinist and conductor (d. 1985)
  1899   – Howard Thurman, American author, philosopher and civil rights activist (d. 1981)

1901–present
1901 – V. Shantaram, Indian actor, director, producer, and screenwriter (d. 1984)
  1901   – Craig Wood, American golfer (d. 1968)
1902 – Franklin Adreon, American film and television director (d. 1979)
1904 – Alan Lennox-Boyd, 1st Viscount Boyd of Merton, English lieutenant and politician, Secretary of State for the Colonies (d. 1983)
  1904   – Masao Koga, Japanese composer and guitarist (d. 1978)
1906 – Sait Faik Abasıyanık, Turkish author and poet (d. 1954)
  1906   – Alec Issigonis, Greek-English car designer, designed the mini car (d. 1988)
  1906   – Klaus Mann, German-American novelist, short story writer, and critic (d. 1949)
  1906   – George Wald, American neurobiologist and academic, Nobel Prize laureate (d. 1997)
1907 – Gustav Nezval, Czech actor (d. 1998)
  1907   – Compay Segundo, Cuban singer-songwriter and guitarist (d. 2003)
1908 – Imogene Coca, American actress, comedian, and singer (d. 2001)
1909 – Johnny Mercer, American singer-songwriter and producer, co-founded Capitol Records (d. 1976)
1911 – Attilio Bertolucci, Italian poet and author (d. 2000)
1912 – Vic Hey, Australian rugby league player and coach (d. 1995)
  1912   – Hilda Nickson, English author (d. 1977)
1913 – Endre Rozsda, Hungarian-French painter and illustrator (d. 1999)
1914 – Haguroyama Masaji, Japanese sumo wrestler, the 36th Yokozuna (d. 1969)
1915 – Ken Burkhart, American baseball player and umpire (d. 2004)
1917 – Pedro Infante, Mexican actor and singer (d. 1957)
1918 – İlhan Berk, Turkish poet and author (d. 2008)
  1918   – Tasker Watkins, Welsh soldier, judge, and politician, Victoria Cross recipient (d. 2007)
1919 – Jocelyn Brando, American actress (d. 2005)
1920 – Mustafa Khalil, Egyptian lawyer and politician, 77th Prime Minister of Egypt (d. 2008)
  1920   – Robert Fryer, American playwright and producer (d. 2000)
  1920   – Ron Suart,  English football player and manager (d. 2015)
1922 – Luis Somoza Debayle, Nicaraguan politician, 70th President of Nicaragua (d. 1967)
  1922   – Marjorie Gestring, American springboard diver (d. 1992)
1923 – Ted Stevens, American politician (d. 2010)
1924 – Alexander Mackenzie Stuart, Baron Mackenzie-Stuart, Scottish soldier, engineer, and judge (d. 2000)
  1924   – Anna Elisabeth (Lise) Østergaard, Danish psychologist and politician (d. 1996)
1925 – Gene Mauch, American baseball player and manager (d. 2005)
1927 – Hank Ballard, American R&B singer-songwriter (d. 2003)
  1927   – Knowlton Nash, Canadian journalist and author (d. 2014)
1928 – Salvador Laurel, Filipino lawyer and politician, 5th Prime Minister of the Philippines (d. 2004)
  1928   – Sheila Jordan, American singer-songwriter and pianist
1929 – Gianna D'Angelo, American soprano and educator (d. 2013)
1932 – Danny McDevitt, American baseball player (d. 2010) 
1933 – Bruce Conner, American painter, photographer, and director (d. 2008)
1934 – Vassilis Vassilikos, Greek journalist and diplomat
1935 – Rudolf Bahro, German philosopher and politician (d. 1997)
1936 – Ennio Antonelli, Italian cardinal
  1936   – Don Cherry, American trumpet player (d. 1995)
1938 – Jules Mikhael Al-Jamil, Iraqi-Lebanese archbishop (d. 2012)
  1938   – Norbert Ratsirahonana, Malagasy politician, Prime Minister of Madagascar
  1938   – Karl Schranz, Austrian skier
1939 – Margaret Atwood, Canadian author
  1939   Margaret Jay, Baroness Jay of Paddington, English journalist and politician, Leader of the House of Lords
  1939   – Amanda Lear, Hong Kong-French singer-songwriter and actress
1940 – James Welch, American novelist and poet (d. 2003)
1941 – Gary Bettenhausen, American race car driver (d. 2014)
1942 – Susan Sullivan, American actress
1943 – Leonardo Sandri, Argentinian cardinal
1944 – Wolfgang Joop, German fashion designer, founded JOOP!
  1944   – Edwin C. Krupp, American astronomer, archaeoastronomer, author, Director Griffith Observatory
1945 – Wilma Mankiller, American tribal chief (d. 2010)
  1945   – Mahinda Rajapaksa, Sri Lankan lawyer and politician, 6th President of Sri Lanka
1947 – Ross Wilson, Australian singer-songwriter, guitarist, and producer
1948 – Tõnis Mägi, Estonian singer-songwriter, guitarist, and actor
  1948   – Kongō Masahiro, Japanese sumo wrestler (d. 2014)
  1948   – Ana Mendieta, Cuban-American sculptor and painter (d. 1985)
  1948   – Jack Tatum, American football player (d. 2010)
1949 – Herman Rarebell, German rock drummer and songwriter
1950 – Graham Parker, English singer-songwriter and guitarist
  1950   – Rudy Sarzo, Cuban-American rock bass player
1951 – Pete Morelli, American businessman
  1951   – Justin Raimondo, American journalist and author (d. 2019)
1952 – Peter Beattie, Australian lawyer and politician, 36th Premier of Queensland
  1952   – Delroy Lindo, English-American actor and director
  1952   – John Parr, English singer-songwriter and guitarist
1953 – Jan Kuehnemund, American rock guitarist (d. 2013)
1954 – Carter Burwell, American composer and conductor
1956 – Noel Brotherston, Irish-English footballer and painter (d. 1995)
  1956   – Warren Moon, American football player and sportscaster
  1956   – Jim Weirich, American computer scientist, developed Rake Software (d. 2014)
1957 – Tony Bunn, American bassist, composer, producer, and writer
1958 – Daniel Brailovsky, Argentine-born Israeli footballer and manager
1959 – Jimmy Quinn, Northern Irish footballer and manager
1960 – Ivans Klementjevs, Latvian canoeist
  1960   – Yeşim Ustaoğlu, Turkish director, producer, and screenwriter
  1960   – Kim Wilde, English singer-songwriter
1962 – Bart Bryant, American golfer
1963 – Len Bias, American basketball player (d. 1986)
  1963   – Dante Bichette, American baseball player and coach
  1963   – Peter Schmeichel, Danish footballer and sportscaster
  1963   – Joost Zwagerman, Dutch author and poet (d. 2015)
1964 – Rita Cosby, American journalist and author
  1964   – Nadia Sawalha, English actress
1965 – Tim DeLaughter, American singer-songwriter and musician
1967 – Tom Gordon, American baseball player
  1967   – Jocelyn Lemieux, Canadian ice hockey player and sportscaster
1968 – George Kotsiopoulos, American stylist and journalist
  1968   – Romany Malco, American rapper, producer, actor, and screenwriter
  1968   – Gary Sheffield, American baseball player
1969 – Ahmed Helmy, Egyptian actor
  1969   – Koichiro Kimura, Japanese mixed martial artist and wrestler (d. 2014)
1970 – Megyn Kelly, American lawyer and journalist
  1970   – Peta Wilson, Australian model and actress
1971 – Thérèse Coffey, English chemist and politician
  1971   – Terrance Hayes, American poet and academic
  1971   – Matthew Rodwell, Australian rugby league player and sportscaster
1972 – Jeroen Straathof, Dutch cyclist and speed skater
1973 – Jonnie Irwin, English television presenter and business expert
  1973   – Nic Pothas, South African cricketer and coach
1974 – Graham Coughlan, Irish footballer and coach
  1974   – Petter Solberg, Norwegian racing driver
1975 – Lucy Akhurst, English actress and producer
  1975   – Shawn Camp, American baseball player
  1975   – Anthony McPartlin, English comedian, actor, and producer
  1975   – Pastor Troy, American rapper, producer, and actor
  1975   – Jason Williams, American basketball player
1976 – Shagrath, Norwegian singer-songwriter
  1976   – Dominic Armato, American voice actor
  1976   – Sage Francis, American rapper
  1976   – Matt Welsh, Australian swimmer
  1976   – Mona Zaki, Egyptian actress
1977 – Trent Barrett, Australian rugby league player, coach, and sportscaster
1978 – Damien Johnson, Irish footballer
  1978   – Aldo Montano, Italian fencer
1979 – Neeti Mohan, Indian playback singer
1980 – Hamza al-Ghamdi, Saudi Arabian terrorist, hijacker of United Airlines Flight 175 (d. 2001)
  1980   – Luke Chadwick, English footballer
  1980   – Minori Chihara, Japanese voice actress and singer
  1980   – François Duval, Belgian racing driver
  1980   – Denny Hamlin, American race car driver
1981 – Dianne dela Fuente, Filipino singer and actress
  1981   – Nasim Pedrad, Iranian-American actress
  1981   – Vittoria Puccini, Italian actress
1982 – Greg Estandia, American football player
  1982   – Justin Anthony Knapp, Wikipedia editor
1983 – Travis Buck, American baseball player
  1983   – Michael Dawson, English footballer
  1983   – Jon Lech Johansen, Norwegian computer programmer and engineer, created DeCSS
1984 – Ryohei Chiba, Japanese singer and dancer 
  1984   – Enar Jääger, Estonian footballer
1985 – Allyson Felix, American sprinter
1987 – Yoon Park, South Korean actor
1988 – Jeffrey Jordan, American basketball player
  1988   – Michael Roach, American soccer player
  1988   – Marie-Josée Ta Lou, Ivorian sprinter
1989 – Lu Jiajing, Chinese tennis player
1991 – Ahmed Kelly, Iraqi-Australian swimmer
  1991   – Noppawan Lertcheewakarn, Thai tennis player
1992 – Steven Skrzybski, German footballer
1994 – Danka Kovinić, Montenegrin professional tennis player
  1994   – Bernhard Luxbacher, Austrian footballer
  1994   – Akiyuki Hashimoto, Japanese sprinter

Deaths

Pre-1600
 942 – Odo of Cluny, Frankish abbot and saint (b. c. 878)
 953 – Liutgard of Saxony, duchess of Lorraine (b. 931)
1100 – Thomas of Bayeux, archbishop of York
1154 – Adelaide of Maurienne, French queen consort (b. 1092)
1170 – Albert the Bear, margrave of Brandenburg (b. c. 1100)
1259 – Adam Marsh, English scholar and theologian
1305 – John II, duke of Brittany (b. 1239)
1313 – Constance of Portugal, Portuguese infanta (b. 1290)
1349 – Frederick II, Margrave of Meissen (b. 1310)
1441 – Roger Bolingbroke, English cleric, astronomer, astrologer, magister and alleged necromancer
1472 – Basilius Bessarion, titular patriarch of Constantinople (b. c. 1403)
1482 – Gedik Ahmed Pasha, Ottoman politician, 17th Grand Vizier of the Ottoman Empire
1559 – Cuthbert Tunstall, English bishop (b. 1474)
1565 – Yun Won-hyung, Korean writer and politician (b. 1509)
1590 – George Talbot, 6th Earl of Shrewsbury, English commander and politician, Lord High Steward of Ireland (b. 1528)

1601–1900
1664 – Miklós Zrínyi, Croatian and Hungarian military leader and statesman (b. 1620)
1724 – Bartolomeu de Gusmão, Portuguese priest (b. 1685)
1785 – Louis Philippe I, Duke of Orléans (b. 1725)
1797 – Jacques-Alexandre Laffon de Ladebat, French shipbuilder and merchant (b. 1719)
1804 – Philip Schuyler, American general and senator (b. 1733)
1814 – William Jessop, English engineer (b. 1745)
1830 – Adam Weishaupt, German philosopher and academic, founded the Illuminati (b. 1748)
1841 – Agustín Gamarra, Peruvian general and politician, 10th and 14th President of Peru (b. 1785)
1852 – Rose Philippine Duchesne, French-American nun and saint (b. 1769)
1886 – Chester A. Arthur, American general, lawyer, and politician, 21st President of the United States (b. 1829)
1889 – William Allingham, Irish-English poet and scholar (b. 1824)

1901–present
1909 – Renée Vivien, English-French poet (b. 1877)
1922 – Marcel Proust, French author and critic (b. 1871)
1927 – Scipione Borghese, 10th Prince of Sulmona Italian race car driver, explorer, and politician (b. 1871)
1936 – V. O. Chidambaram Pillai, Indian lawyer and politician (b. 1872)
1940 – Ivane Javakhishvili, Georgian historian and academic (b. 1876)
1941 – Émile Nelligan, Canadian poet and author (b. 1879)
  1941   – Walther Nernst, German chemist and physicist, Nobel Prize laureate (b. 1864)
  1941   – Chris Watson, Chilean-Australian journalist and politician, 3rd Prime Minister of Australia (b. 1867)
1952 – Paul Éluard, French poet and author (b. 1895)
1962 – Niels Bohr, Danish footballer, physicist, and academic, Nobel Prize laureate (b. 1885)
1965 – Henry A. Wallace, American agronomist and bureaucrat, 33rd Vice President of the United States, 11th  US Secretary of Agriculture (b. 1888)
1969 – Ted Heath, English trombonist and bandleader (b. 1902)
  1969   – Joseph P. Kennedy Sr., American businessman and diplomat, 44th United States Ambassador to the United Kingdom (b. 1888)
1972 – Danny Whitten, American singer-songwriter and guitarist (Crazy Horse) (b. 1943)
1976 – Man Ray, American-French photographer and painter (b. 1890)
1977 – Kurt Schuschnigg, Italian-Austrian lawyer and politician, 15th Federal Chancellor of Austria (b. 1897)
1978 – Jim Jones, American cult leader, founded Peoples Temple (b. 1931)
  1978   – Leo Ryan, American soldier, educator, and politician (b. 1925)
1979 – Freddie Fitzsimmons, American baseball player, coach, and manager (b. 1901)
1980 – Conn Smythe, Canadian soldier, ice hockey player, and businessman (b. 1895)
1984 – Mary Hamman, American journalist and author (b. 1907)
1986 – Gia Carangi, American model (b. 1960)
1987 – Jacques Anquetil, French cyclist (b. 1934)
1991 – Gustáv Husák, Slovak lawyer and politician, 9th President of Czechoslovakia (b. 1913)
1994 – Cab Calloway, American singer-songwriter and bandleader (The Cab Calloway Orchestra) (b. 1907)
  1994   – Peter Ledger, Australian painter and illustrator (b. 1945)
1995 – Miron Grindea, Romanian-English journalist (b. 1909)
  1998   – Tara Singh Hayer, Indian-Canadian journalist and publisher (b. 1936)
1999 – Paul Bowles, American composer and author (b. 1910)
  1999   – Doug Sahm, American singer and guitarist (b. 1941)
2001 – Walter Matuszczak, Polish-American football player 1939 All-America, 1941 New York Giants draft (b. 1918)
2002 – James Coburn, American actor (b. 1928)
2003 – Michael Kamen, American composer and conductor (b. 1948)
2004 – Robert Bacher, American physicist and academic (b. 1905)
  2004   – Cy Coleman, American pianist and composer (b. 1929)
2005 – Harold J. Stone, American actor (b. 1911)
2009 – Red Robbins, American basketball player (b. 1944)
2010 – Freddy Beras-Goico, Dominican comedian and television host (b. 1940)
  2010   – Brian G. Marsden, English-American astronomer and academic (b. 1937)
2012 – Emilio Aragón Bermúdez, Spanish clown, singer, and accordion player (b. 1929)
  2012   – Phoebe Hearst Cooke, American businesswoman and philanthropist (b. 1927)
2013 – Thomas Howard, American football player (b. 1983)
  2013   – S. R. D. Vaidyanathan, Indian nadaswaram player and composer (b. 1929)
  2013   – Ljubomir Vračarević,  Serbian martial artist, founded Real Aikido (b. 1947)
  2013   – Peter Wintonick, Canadian director and producer (b. 1953)
2014 – Dave Appell, American singer-songwriter and producer (b. 1922)
  2014   – Pepe Eliaschev, Argentinian journalist and author (b. 1945)
  2014   – Ahmad Lozi, Jordanian educator and politician, 48th Prime Minister of Jordan (b. 1925)
  2014   – C. Rudhraiya, Indian director and producer (b. 1947)
2015 – Abdelhamid Abaaoud, Belgian-Moroccan terrorist (b. 1987)
  2015   – Dan Halldorson, Canadian-American golfer (b. 1952)
  2015   – Jonah Lomu, New Zealand rugby player (b. 1975)
2016 – Sharon Jones, American soul and funk singer (b. 1956)
  2016   – Denton Cooley, American surgeon and scientist (b. 1920)
2017 – Malcolm Young, Scottish-Australian hard rock guitarist (b. 1953)
2022 – Tabassum, Indian actress and talk show host (b. 1944)

Holidays and observances
 Christian feast day:
 Abhai of Hach (Syriac Orthodox Church)
 Alphaeus and Zacchaeus
 Barulas
 Constant
 Dedication of Saints Peter and Paul
 Elizabeth of Hungary (Church of England)
 Juthwara 
 Mabyn (Roman Catholic Church and Anglicanism)
 The main day of the Feast of the Virgen de Chiquinquirá or Chinita's Fair (Maracaibo, Venezuela)
 Maudez (Mawes)
 Nazarius (Nazaire)
 Odo of Cluny
 Romanus of Caesarea
 Rose Philippine Duchesne 
 November 18 (Eastern Orthodox liturgics)
 Day of Army and Victory (Haiti)
 Independence Day (Morocco), celebrates the independence of Morocco from France and Spain in 1956.
 National Day (Oman)
 Proclamation Day of the Republic of Latvia celebrates the independence of Latvia from Russia in 1918. 
Remembrance Day of the Sacrifice of Vukovar in 1991 (Croatia)

References

External links

 BBC: On This Day
 
 Historical Events on November 18

Days of the year
November